A bastion is a fortification work projecting outward from the main enclosure.

Bastion may also refer to:

Arts and media 
Bastion (band), a Yugoslav synth-pop band
Bastion (comics), a Marvel Comics supervillain
Bastion (video game), a 2011 action role-playing video game by Supergiant Games
 Bastion (Overwatch), a character in the 2016 video game Overwatch
Bruckell Bastion, a parody of the Dodge Charger, appears in the videogame BeamNG.drive

Military
Bastion fort
Bastion (naval), a heavily defended area of water in which friendly naval forces can operate safely
9M117 Bastion, an anti-tank missile
K-300P Bastion-P, a coastal defense missile system
Camp Bastion, the main British military base in Afghanistan
USS Bastion (ACM-6), a 1942 minelayer in World War 2
ACMAT Bastion, a modern French armoured personnel carrier

Other uses
Bastion, a special form of Gabion
Bastion (restaurant), a restaurant in Kinsale, Ireland
Bastion Collective, a global marketing and advertising company
The Bastion Museum, dedicated to the work of Jean Cocteau in Menton, France

See also 
Bastion host, a computer on a network specifically designed and configured to withstand attack
Bastion Misawa, a fictional duelist